Aglais ichnusa is a small butterfly found in the Palearctic that belongs to the browns family. It is endemic to Corsica and Sardinia.

Description from Seitz

— ichnusa Bon. (62f ) is distinguished particularly by the less angulate wings, the deeper red ground-colour, and usually by  the absence of the discal and hindmarginal spots of the forewing. Closely allied to the following race [turcica Stgr. now Aglais urticae turcica (Staudinger, 1871)], transitions from the nymotypical subspecies to ichnusa occur in the southern districts of the latter. Sardinia, Corsica.

Food plants
Larvae of Aglais ichnusa feed on Urtica atrovirens and Urtica dioica.

See also
List of butterflies of Europe

References

Nymphalini
Butterflies described in 1826